Ophichthus roseus is an eel in the family Ophichthidae (worm/snake eels). It was described by Shigeho Tanaka in 1917. It is a marine, tropical eel which is known from the western Pacific Ocean.

References

Fish described in 1917
roseus